United Nations Security Council Resolution 301, adopted on October 20, 1971, after reaffirming previous resolutions on the topic, the Council condemned the Bantustans, which they described as moves designed to destroy unity and territorial integrity along with South Africa's continued illegal presence in Namibia, then known as South West Africa.

The Council finished by calling upon all states to support the rights of the people of Namibia by fully implementing the provisions of this resolutions and requested the Secretary-General to report periodically on the implementation of the resolution.

The resolution was adopted by 13 votes to none, with France and the United Kingdom abstaining.

This was the last resolution adopted prior to the expulsion of the Republic of China (headquartered in Taiwan) from the United Nations, when the People's Republic of China replaced it.

See also
 List of United Nations Security Council Resolutions 301 to 400 (1971–1976)
 South Africa under apartheid

References
Text of the Resolution at undocs.org

External links
 

 0301
 0301
 0301
October 1971 events